Oldenburg is an unincorporated community in unincorporated northeastern Fayette County, Texas, United States.

The community was named after the Oldenburg state in Germany.

External links
 OLDENBURG, TX Handbook of Texas Online.

Unincorporated communities in Fayette County, Texas
Unincorporated communities in Texas